Nisbet McRobie (5 November 1872 – 27 September 1929) was a New Zealand rugby union player, master printer, newspaper proprietor, and politician.

Rugby union
A hooker, McRobie represented, and often captained,  at a provincial level between 1889 and 1896.  In 1896 he became the first player from the Southland union to play for the New Zealand national side, when he appeared in a match against the touring Queensland team.  That was his only game for New Zealand. He later served on the management committee of the New Zealand Rugby Union between 1900 and 1901.

Printing and newspaper career
After completing his printing apprenticeship, McRobie worked for The Press in Christchurch, The Timaru Herald, and The New Zealand Times in Wellington, becoming the factory manager for the latter newspaper in 1904. After a period managing the Pahiatua Herald, McRobie was appointed general manager of The New Zealand Times. In 1909 he purchased the Waihi Daily Times, but sold that publication in 1915, and moved to Auckland, where he became the manager of Business Printing Works Limited.  McRobie served as president of the Auckland Master Printers' Association between 1916 and 1924, and was president of the New Zealand Master Printers' Federation from 1922 to 1924.

Politics
At the 1911 general election, McRobie stood as the Reform Party candidate in the Ohinemuri electorate. He finished in third place, behind the incumbent, Hugh Poland of the LIberal Party, and the Socialist candidate, Pat Hickey.

Death
McRobie died at his home in the Auckland suburb of Epsom on 28 September 1929, after a long illness. He was buried at Hillsborough Cemetery.

References

1872 births
1929 deaths
Rugby union players from Invercargill
New Zealand rugby union players
New Zealand international rugby union players
Southland rugby union players
Rugby union hookers
Reform Party (New Zealand) politicians
New Zealand publishers (people)
Unsuccessful candidates in the 1911 New Zealand general election
Burials at Hillsborough Cemetery, Auckland